Ronald "Ronnie" E. Holmberg (born January 27, 1938) is a former American tennis player who competed during the 1950s, 1960s and 1970s. He was ranked World No. 7 in 1960 and was ranked in the U.S. Top 10 for nine years. He is currently one of the USPTA's select "Master Professionals" and devotes most of his time coaching, participating and directing charity events and clinics and other tennis related projects.

Summary

 Won his first tournament at age 12 and won three out of the four possible U.S. National Boys' titles in 1953.
 Won the Junior Wimbledon title in 1956.
 Graduated from Tulane University where he was a three time All-American. Won the SEC singles twice and doubles championship three times and the NCAA doubles championship twice.
 Was a U.S. National Championships (the US Open) Men's Singles semifinalist in 1959, a Quarter-Finalist in 1961 and a French (the French Open) quarterfinalist in 1961.
 Was ranked No. 7 in the world in 1960 and ranked in the top 10 of U.S. Men's singles for nine years.
 Was selected to be a playing member of the U.S. Davis Cup Team four times.
 Played in several Blue Gray events when it was an individual competition. Won the singles championship in 1959. Captured back-to-back Blue Gray doubles titles in 1957 and 1958.
 Won numerous international doubles titles with many prominent players such as Barry MacKay (in Davis Cup), Pancho Gonzalez, John Newcombe, Tony Roche, Bob Mark and Arthur Ashe. Holmberg and Ashe were ranked No. 3 in the U.S.
 After retiring from professional competition in 1971, became Head Coach of Tennis and Squash at the U.S. Military Academy, West Point.
 Continues to be involved in teaching tennis to this day and is widely recognized as one of the game's outstanding coaches. Member of Tennis Magazine’s “Instruction Advisory Board” which consisted of the top playing and teaching pros in the game for its duration of 19 years.
 Was inducted into the Intercollegiate Tennis Hall-of-Fame, the USTA Eastern Tennis Hall-of-Fame, Louisiana Tennis Hall-of-Fame and the USTA Southern Tennis Hall-of-Fame his eighth Hall of Fame
 Recipient of the USPTA “Lifetime Achievement Award” in 1997 for his all-around accomplishment in both playing and teaching
 Received the USTA George Seewagen Award in 1999 for excellence in playing and service to the game

Biography

The following biography is based on the USTA Eastern Tennis Hall of Fame and USTA Southern Tennis Hall of Fame inductions. The original text was submitted to the USTA by tennis historian Steve Flink and presented by him during the induction ceremony.

In the late 1950s and ‘60s World Tennis magazine frequently paid tribute to Ron Holmberg’s tennis ability:  “Holmberg can do more with a tennis ball than any other player of his era. There is no shot that is beyond his aptitude ... His touch, power and stroke making are beautiful to watch.”

Indeed, the U.S. Tennis Association Official Encyclopedia of Tennis sites Holmberg as one of “the leading tennis players of his day.”  He ranked among the top 10 in U.S. Men’s Singles nine times during the 1950s and 1960s, he was a semifinalist at the U.S. National Championships (the US Open), a quarter-finalist at the French (the French Open), won the singles title once and doubles title twice at the Canadian Open in Toronto and he won the U.S. National Indoor Doubles Championship among other titles.

Steve Flink, a past editor of World Tennis said, “His record was impressive, but more importantly, Holmberg was a spectator’s delight. Ron was his own kind of player, a consummate stylist, which made him stand out. He reminded me of Ken Rosewall in that he was so effortless. He could hit winners from everywhere.”  In fact, Flink remembers watching him play Rosewall in the Wimbledon warm-up at the Queen’s Club, London, in the late ‘60s. Holmberg was down a set and 2-0, but after a rain delay, he found his timing and completely took over the match.  “He was brilliant!” said Flink.

Holmberg learned the game in his native Brooklyn at Fort Greene Park and progressed through the N.Y.C. Parks system. Tennis was merely another game to complement baseball and basketball, but his potential carried him beyond his roots into the national arena when he was 14. He met teaching pro John Nogrady, who was a tremendous help, especially with match-play strategy. During these formative years Holmberg worked closely with some of the all-time greats:  Pancho Segura, Pancho Gonzalez, Bobby Riggs, Jack Kramer and Emmett Paré’, all top playing professionals who took him under their wing and remained good friends throughout his career to the present. In 1953, at age 15, Ron won three out of the four U.S. National Boys’ titles and in 1954, played in his first U.S. National Men’s Championships at Forest Hills (US Open).

Attaining a top junior ranking in the United States, Holmberg was highly recruited and wound up taking his powerful serve and volley game to New Orleans, Louisiana and Coach Emmett Paré’ at Tulane University. Winner of Junior Wimbledon Singles in 1956, he was named All-American three successive years and twice won the NCAA Doubles Championship, prior to graduation from Tulane University. While at Tulane, he was the SEC Singles Champion in 1958 and 1959 and the SEC Doubles Champion in ’57, ’58 and ’59 with Crawford Henry and Lester Sack. In 1956 Holmberg began a string of appearances at the Men’s Sugar Bowl Tennis Classic in New Orleans that lasted nearly two decades. During that time he won twelve singles and doubles titles.

A former playing member of the U.S. Davis Cup Team, Holmberg was ranked No. 7 in the world in 1960 and in the “Top Ten” in U.S. Men’s Singles for nine years. Ron also won numerous international doubles titles with many prominent partners such as Barry MacKay (in Davis Cup), Pancho Gonzalez, John Newcombe, Tony Roche, Bob Mark, and Arthur Ashe (Holmberg and Ashe were ranked # 3 in the U.S.). Ron spent nineteen years on the “International Circuit” and in 1971 retired from professional competition to become Head Coach of Tennis and Squash at the U.S. Military Academy, West Point and served as President of the Eastern Collegiate Tennis Coaches Association.

Holmberg owned and operated The Ron Holmberg Tennis Camps, which were among the premiere tennis camps in the United States from 1971 to 1989.

Today Holmberg has an international reputation as one of the game’s outstanding coaches and is currently one of the USPTA's select "Master Professionals" . “Teaching is terrific, as is coaching”, says Holmberg.  “It’s fun to work with a group when everybody enjoys being there ... I do not choose to teach people strictly on ability, but on their desire to learn. For this reason all my lessons are enjoyable.”

Holmberg’s teaching reflects his approach to life.  “Ron is a direct person and uncompromising in his principles”, says one former student, “but he’s also carefree.”   Holmberg’s personality comes across on the tennis court. He talks about the game in very precise terms, yet he believes players should spend time just fooling around on the court (other than practice). He feels that players who do that love the game and learn to be creative. The Holmberg philosophy:  “Hit the ball as hard as you can and as close to the lines as you can, but don’t miss!”

Holmberg is a member of the ATP, USPTA and USTA. Year-round he directs Junior Development programs and pro/celebrity tournaments  ... conducts corporate outings ... teaches and coaches regional, national and international tournament players ... and conducts clinics and workshops for professional coaches and teachers. Ron also participates in, helps and directs numerous charity events. Ron, a member of the prestigious “Instruction Advisory Board of Tennis Magazine” for its nineteen-year duration, was also director of the Bob Griese / Jerry Lewis Pro-Celebrity Tennis Tournament for Muscular Dystrophy.

Holmberg, a member of the Eastern Tennis Hall of Fame, the Tulane Hall of Fame, the Louisiana Tennis Hall of Fame and the Intercollegiate Tennis Hall of Fame, was elected in 2011 into the Southern Tennis Hall of Fame, his eighth Hall of Fame. He is one of the USPTA's select "Master Professionals".

In 1997 Ron was recipient of the USPTA “Lifetime Achievement Award” which signifies all-around accomplishment in both playing and teaching. In 1999 Holmberg received the USTA “George Seewagen Award” which signifies excellence in playing and service to the game. In 2010 he became Chairman of The Louisiana Tennis Patrons Foundation. In 2015 Ron participated in his 65 consecutive year at the U.S. Open Tennis Championships ... having played in the event from 1953 to 1972 ... a remarkable twenty years. Holmberg has resided in New Orleans since his playing days at Tulane, with stints in both Houston and Dallas, Texas. He also maintains a home – “Match Point Acres” in Cornwall-on-Hudson, New York, with his wife, Sylvia.

Holmberg worked as an ESPN broadcaster over a three-year period beginning in 1981.

Career highlights

 Junior Wimbledon Singles champion in 1956
 Intercollegiate highlights while at Tulane University:
 All-American (first team) (1957, 1958, 1959)
 NCAA Doubles champion with Crawford Henry (1957, 1959)
 SEC Singles champion (1958, 1959),
 SEC Doubles champion with Crawford Henry (1957, 1959), with Lester Sack (1958)
 U.S. National Championships (the US Open) Men's Singles semifinalist (1959)
 U.S. National Championships (the US Open) Men's Singles quarterfinalist (1961)
 French Championships (the French Open) Men's Singles quarterfinalist (1961)
 U.S. National Indoor Doubles Championships, Champion 1961 with Chris Crawford, finalist 1962 with Whitney Reed
 Played in several Blue Gray events when it was an individual competition. In 1959, won the singles championship. In 1957 and 1958, captured back-to-back Blue Gray doubles titles.
 Selected as a playing member to the U.S. Davis Cup Team four times
 Rogers Cup: 1965 Canadian Championships Singles champion
 Rogers Cup: 1965 Canadian Championships Doubles champion with Lester Sack
 Rogers Cup: 1969 Canadian Open Doubles champion with John Newcombe
 Los Angeles Open: 1969 Doubles champion with Pancho Gonzalez
 Ranked in the U.S. "Top Ten" nine times ( 1957 : No 6, 1959 : No 4, 1960 : No 7, 1961 : No 7, 1964 : No 6, 1965 : No 9, 1966 : No 6, 1967 : No 6, 1968 : No 6 )

Junior Grand Slam finals

Singles: 1

Awards and honors

 Inducted into the USTA Eastern Tennis Hall of Fame in 1990
 Inducted into the Intercollegiate Tennis Hall of Fame in 1993
 Recipient of the USPTA “Lifetime Achievement Award” in 1997 for his all-around accomplishment in both playing and teaching
 Received the USTA George Seewagen Award in 1999 for excellence in playing and service to the game
 Inducted into the Louisiana Tennis Hall of Fame in 2006
 Chairman of the Louisiana Tennis Patrons Foundation
 Member of the USPTA select "Master Professionals"
 Inducted into the 2007 Blue Gray National Tennis Classic Hall of Fame
 Inducted into the USTA Southern Tennis Hall of Fame in 2011
 Inducted into the Brooklyn Hall of Fame in 2012
 Inducted into the Tulane Athletic Hall of Fame in 1980
 Inducted into Who’s Who at Tulane University in 1960
 Inducted into the Bishop Loughlin Memorial High School Hall of Fame in 1991
 Inducted into Catholic High School Athletic Association (CHSAA) Sports Hall of Fame

Books and magazines

 As a member of the “Instruction Advisory Board" of Tennis Magazine for nineteen years he was featured in the "Classic Instruction Series from Tennis Magazine" which included the following three books: "Tennis Strokes & Strategies", "Tennis: How to Play, How to Win", and "Teach Yourself Tennis!"

Articles

 Life Magazine "A Tennis Future in Kids"
 New York Magazine "How to Play Tennis with Rod Laver and Other Hot-Shots"
 Sports Illustrated "Scorecard"
 Sports Illustrated "An Absence Of Homebreds"
 Sports Illustrated "...these Faces In The Crowd..."
 Sports Illustrated "Great Scott! Gene Won Another One"
 Sports Illustrated "Tennis without Trabert"
 nola.com "Ron Holmberg selected to Southern Tennis Association Hall of Fame"
 City Park Tennis Club of New Orleans "2011 Interview with Ron Holmberg"

References

External links

 
 
 

American male tennis players
People from Fort Greene, Brooklyn
Sportspeople from New Orleans
People from Cornwall-on-Hudson, New York
Tennis commentators
Tennis people from New York (state)
Wimbledon junior champions
1938 births
Living people
Tulane University alumni
Tulane Green Wave men's tennis players
Grand Slam (tennis) champions in boys' singles
Bishop Loughlin Memorial High School alumni